Elliott's Cove is a settlement located southeast of Clarenville in Newfoundland and Labrador, Canada. It is located on the western coast of Random Island.

See also
 List of communities in Newfoundland and Labrador

Populated coastal places in Canada
Populated places in Newfoundland and Labrador